Vladimir Kuspish (born 1942) was a Soviet Union judoka. He was the champion in judo U70kg at the 1965 European Judo Championships.

References 

1942 births

Possibly living people
Soviet male judoka